Nos Pais (English: Our Country) is a television station that broadcasts on NTSC channel 4 in Curaçao. Its programming is in several languages: Papiamento, Dutch and English. Mavis Albertina founded the network in 2012 with the objective of creating a much more involved society in the Dutch Caribbean. Nos Pais Television has a modern studio complex in the Saliña area and has invested in high-definition television technology.

See also
List of television stations in the Caribbean
TeleCuraçao
Telearuba
15 ATV
RTV-7

References

External links
Official website 

Television stations in Curaçao
Multilingual broadcasters
English-language television stations
Dutch-language mass media
Papiamento-language mass media